Herbert Müller Rebmann (11 May 1940 – 24 May 1981) was a racing driver from Switzerland. He was born in Reinach and was nicknamed Stumpen-Herbie. Among other successes, he won the Targa Florio twice, in 1966 and 1973, both with Porsche.

Driving a Ferrari 512 in an Interserie race at the Nürburgring, he survived a fiery start collision that ended in the pit lane next to a fire engine. Müller got out of the car and ran towards a fire fighter who put out the flames on his overall.

He died in the 1981 1000 km Nürburgring in his Porsche 908 Turbo, racing with his longtime friend Siegfried Brunn. Before the event, Müller stated that he would retire from motorsports after the end of the race. On lap 17 of the race, Müller crashed while attempting to avoid another driver who had spun in front of him at Kesselchen. He collided heavily with an earth bank and then hit a previously retired car driven by Bobby Rahal, causing a large explosion and fire. He was dead by the time he was removed from the burning car; he had not been wearing his safety belts at the time of the crash, and was killed in the initial impact. The race was stopped after 17 laps and was not completed.

Racing record

Complete Formula One World Championship results
(key) (Races in bold indicate pole position, races in italics indicate fastest lap)

Non-championship Formula One results
(key) (Races in bold indicate pole position, races in italics indicate fastest lap)

24 Hours of Le Mans results

References

External links
Web site
Another web site

Swiss racing drivers
Racing drivers who died while racing
Sport deaths in Germany
Can-Am entrants
24 Hours of Le Mans drivers
1940 births
1981 deaths
World Sportscar Championship drivers
Swiss Formula One drivers
12 Hours of Reims drivers
Porsche Motorsports drivers